Kurauni is a village of India, which is located at Sheikhpura District in Bihar State in India. The old name of the village is Kurhani. The village comes in Mehus Panchyat, Police station is Korma, post office is Katri, Block Sheikhpura, Loksabha MP Constituency is Nawada and Mp is Chandan Singh and MLA Seat Area is Barbigha And MLA is Sudarshan Kumar. The total population of the village was 1,043 as per 2001 census report. The market of the village is Sheikhpura, Barbigha.

Education
Utkarmit Middle School, Kurauni from nursery to class 8
High School, Katari from class 8 to class 10
S S College, Mehus
CNB College, Hathiyawan

Temples
Bhagwati Sthan, the oldest temple of the village
Shiv Temple
Hanuman Temple
A land where some statue of God comes out from a tree

Travel and transport
The village can be reached by road and by rail.

External links

Villages in Sheikhpura district